This is a list, as yet incomplete, of Christian monasteries and religious houses, both extant and dissolved, in Estonia, for both men and women. For churches, see List of churches in Estonia, List of cathedrals in Estonia

List of Christian monasteries in Estonia
 Kärkna Abbey Catholic (disused)
 Padise Abbey Catholic (disused)
 Pirita Convent Catholic
 Pühtitsa Convent Orthodox
 New Pirita Convent (New St. Bridget convent)

Christian monasteries in Estonia
Christian monasteries
Estonia